Captain Richard Saher de Quincey ("the Captain") (12 November 1896, Surbiton, Surrey30 December 1965, Marden, Herefordshire) was a noted British cattle breeder.

De Quincey fought in World War I as a fighter pilot in the Royal Flying Corps but was invalided out of the service as result of the effects of flying at high altitude.

De Quincy's father bought The Vern - a farm at Bodenham, Herefordshire - in 1922. The farm came with a herd of Hereford cattle which the younger de Quincey successfully improved, his bulls winning many prizes and export markets.

References

1896 births
1965 deaths
People from Surbiton
People from Herefordshire
Royal Flying Corps officers
Animal husbandry